Yanaqucha (Quechua yana black, very dark, qucha lake, lagoon, "black lake", Hispanicized spelling Yanacocha) is a lake in Peru located in the Pasco Region, Pasco Province, Tinyahuarco District. It lies southeast of the mining town Cerro de Pasco and east of Tinyahuarco.

References 

Lakes of Peru
Lakes of Pasco Region